NH 111 may refer to:

 National Highway 111 (India)
 New Hampshire Route 111, United States